The Men's 1,500m freestyle event at the 2010 South American Games was held on March 28, with the slow heat at 10:15 and the fast heat at 18:00.

Medalists

Records

Results

Final

References
Final

Freestyle 1500m M